The Tapura Amui No Tuhaa Pae, (also known as Tapura Amui No Te Faatereraa Manahune) was a political party in French Polynesia. They had a left political leaning, and advocated for French Polynesian independence.

The party small in their scope, only lasting between the years of 2001 and 2018, and only taking part in 4 elections with a single representative, Chantal Florès-Tahiata, in all elections. Chantal Florès-Tahiata was also the mayor of Tubuai.

They were largely created for the Tapura Amui no te Faatereraa Manahune - Tuhaa Pae coalition.

Elections

2001 
For the Territorial elections of 2001, Chantal Florès-Tahiata was elected in the Austral Islands.

2004 and Political Crisis 
For the Territorial elections of 2004, Chantal Florès-Tahiata was re-elected in the Austral Islands for the Tapura Amui no te Faatereraa Manahune - Tuhaa Pae coalition and joined the Union for Democracy (UPLD) group. Foe this election, the party campaigned on national radio and television broadcasts.

The party took part in the 2004 french Polynesian Political crisis, when the main opposition party, Union for the Democracy with the help of the single seat parties of Fetia Api, No Oe E Te Nunaa and Tapura Amui no Tuhaa Pae formed a grand coalition to defeat the government of Gaston Flosse. The single seat parties, including Tapura Amui no Tuhaa Pae, were pivotal in this, as if any of them had lost their seats in the 2004 election the conservative government of Gaston Flosse would have been able to survive.

Tapura Amui no Tuhaa Pae was especially important in this election due to the specifically tight election on the Austral Islands. The Tapura Amui no Tuhaa Pae party won 1223 votes with 34.10% of the votes cast. However, Gaston Flosse's Tahoeraa won 2363 votes with 65.90% of the votes cast. The Tahoeraa party had won an overall 28 seats in the election and needed only 1 more seat to have a majority within the assembly. Yet the party missed the third seat by only 28 votes.

2008 
For the 2008 territorial elections, Chantal Florès-Tahiata was again re-elected in the Austral Islands for the Tapura Amui no te Faatereraa Manahune - Tuhaa Pae coalition. During this election, there was a political campaign which aired on national radio and television. For the Windward Islands, the party advertised on the dates of January 21, and 22 of 2008. There were also broadcasts on January 22 and 25 on the Leeward Islands.

2013 
For the 2013 territorial elections, Chantal Florès-Tahiata was re-elected in the Austral Islands for the Union for Democracy (UPLD) coalition.

Notes

References 

Political parties in French Polynesia
2001 establishments in French Polynesia